Juliet Bravo is a British television police procedural drama series, first broadcast on 30 August 1980, that ran for six series and a total of 88 episodes on BBC1. The theme of the series concerned a female police inspector who took over control of a police station in the fictional town of Hartley in Lancashire. The lead role of Inspector Jean Darblay was played by Stephanie Turner in series 1 to 3, but in series 4 to 6 she was replaced by Anna Carteret for the role of Inspector Kate Longton. Carteret remained with the series until its demise in 1985.

The series was devised by Ian Kennedy Martin, who had already enjoyed success with another police drama series, The Sweeney. Although the genre of police dramas was well-established on British television by 1980, Juliet Bravo and London Weekend Television's The Gentle Touch, which started a few months earlier, were the first series that saw female officers as lead characters, having to fight both crime and the prejudice of male colleagues. Kennedy Martin based the character of Jean Darblay on a real female police inspector, Wynne Darwin.

UKTV’s Drama channel reran all six series in 2018 and again in early 2019. The series had previously been repeated in its entirety on the cable and satellite channel UK Gold from the launch in 1992 until 2001.

Production

The series' name was devised from the inspector's radio call sign "J-B" or "Juliet Bravo" as it features in the NATO phonetic alphabet. This sign was used only twice during Stephanie Turner's tenure, both times in series 3, episode 14 Where There's Muck – Stephanie Turner's final outing as the series' protagonist – when Inspector Darblay initially radios into Hartley Police Station from the scene of a road traffic accident involving a lorry carrying chemical-filled drums. On all other occasions she identifies herself as Inspector Darblay in radio communication. However, from the fourth series onwards, the call sign was frequently used. The original working title of the programme was "Inspector, Ma'am," a reference to the lead character's rank and title. This title was held during the filming of the first series, but was dropped prior to broadcast. The character upon whom Inspector Jean Darblay was based held the rank of Inspector at Great Harwood station just outside Blackburn. However, the fictional Lancashire town of Hartley featured in the programme was based on Bacup.

The first two series were produced by Terence Williams. From the third series, Jonathan Alwyn was appointed as producer, with Chris Boucher acting as script editor. Series 4, 5 and 6 were produced by Geraint Morris. The series signature theme tune was composed by Derek Goom. Bob Cosford was the initial graphic designer, who matched the theme tune to the opening and closing graphics centred on a revolving police "star and crown" cap badge, which bore the familiar "E II R" device of English police forces, but in place of the force name around the blue circle, it instead featured the generic words "County Constabulary."

In the first two series, Inspector Darblay is seen driving an orange Austin Mini (licence registration RVH 873T). In the third series she is seen driving a pale yellow Austin Mini Metro (licence registration MVP 519W) which, in episode 4 Amateur Night, she can be seen parking next to an orange Mini – possibly the car used in the previous two series – in the car park outside the Hartley Little Theatre, except for episode 5 A Breach of the Peace where she is seen driving a marked Ford Escort police patrol car.

In the fourth series onwards, Inspector Kate Longton is seen driving a gold Austin Maestro (licence registration SOJ 626Y). It is interesting to note that according to the DVLA web-site, this vehicle was registered in February 1983, yet the official launch date for the Austin Maestro wasn't until 1 March 1983. This was possibly a product placement by the British Leyland (BL Cars) to give their new car some advertising.

Filming locations 
Studio scenes for the first two series were recorded at BBC Television Centre, Wood Lane in London. From the third series onward, studio scenes were recorded at the BBC's Pebble Mill Studios in Birmingham. Exterior scenes were filmed in the Lancashire towns of Colne, Bacup, Accrington, Nelson, Burnley, Todmorden, Blackburn, Simonstone and Read. Other locations around east Lancashire, West Yorkshire and the Black Country (Tipton and Dudley) were also used. The exterior of Hartley Police Station seen throughout the entire series run was in fact the real-life police station on Bank Street in the town of Bacup. When the station closed in 2011, a campaign was mounted by fans of the series to save it from demolition, and turn it into a museum dedicated to the series' legacy. In 2012 it was purchased by a local developer and turned into 6 new flats.

Merchandise
All six series of Juliet Bravo have been released on DVD by 2|Entertain/Cinema Club. Series 1 was released on 12 September 2005. Series 2 was released on 14 November  2005. Series 3 was released on 20 February 2006. Series 4 was released on 22 May 2006. Series 5 was released on 14 August 2006. Series 6 remained unreleased for over two years after the release of Series 5, until a petition created by fans of the series was delivered to 2|Entertain, demanding the sixth and final series be released on DVD. Series 6 was eventually released on 29 September 2008. Series 1 & 2 have also both been released on Region 4 DVD in Australia.

Aside from the DVD releases, the BBC licensed three TV tie-in novelisations of the show. These were authored by Mollie Hardwick. The first two were published by Pan Books. Juliet Bravo 1 (1980) was a novelisation of the first series episodes Shot Gun, Fraudulently Uttered, The Draughtsman, The Runner and Family Unit. Juliet Bravo 2 (1980) was a novelisation of the first series episodes Cages, The One Who Got Away, Relief and The Anastasia Syndrome. A third novel was published by BBC Books. Calling Juliet Bravo: New Arrivals (1981) was a novelisation of the second series episode New Arrivals and the third series episode Cause For Complaint.

A script book, containing five TV scripts from the first series compiled by Alison Leake, was issued by Longman Imprint Books in February 1983. The theme tune was also released on 7-inch vinyl via BBC Records in 1980.

Cast
 Stephanie Turner as Inspector Jean Darblay (Series 1–3)
 Anna Carteret as Inspector Kate Longton (Series 4–6)
 David Ellison as Sergeant Joseph Beck
 Noel Collins as Sergeant George Parrish
 David Hargreaves as Tom Darblay (Series 1–3)
 Tony Caunter as DCI Jim Logan (Series 1–3)
 Edward Peel as DCI Mark Perrin (Series 4–6)
 Mark Drewry as PC Roland Bentley (Series 1)
 Gerard Kelly as PC David Gallagher (Series 2)
 David Straun as PC Martin Helmshore (Series 3)
 C.J. Allen as PC Brian Kelleher (Series 4–6)
 Mark Botham as PC Danny Sparks (Series 4–6)
 Tom Georgeson as John Holden (Series 4)

Recurring cast
 John Ringham as Divisional Supt. Lake (Series 1)
 Geoffrey Larder as DS Dave Melchett (Series 1)
 Wendy Allnutt as Jennie Randall (Series 1)
 Martyn Hesford as PC Ian Skelton (Series 1–2)
 James Grout as Divisional Supt. Albert Hallam (Series 2)
 Lloyd McGuire as DS Bernie Duckworth (Series 2 & 4)
 David Gillies as PC Peter Sims (Series 3)
 Sebastian Abineri as DS Dick Maltby (Series 4–6)
 Julie Foulds as WPC Sheila Saunders (Series 6)

Guest appearances

A number of famous names, either of the time or of the future, appeared in the show. They included David Ryall, Kevin Whately, Eric Richard, Jeff Rawle, Jean Boht, Patricia Hayes, Peter Jeffrey, Peter Martin, Brenda Fricker, David Daker, Andrew Burt, Frances White, Malcolm Terris, Joe Gladwin, Sara Sugarman, Tenniel Evans, Nadim Sawalha, Jack Smethurst, John Savident, William Gaunt, Colin Baker, Kenneth Waller, Rita May, Stephen Yardley, John Woodvine, Stephen McGann, Leslie Schofield, Alan Parnaby, Shirley Stelfox, Maggie Ollerenshaw, John Quarmby, Neil Morrissey, Del Henney, Iain Cuthbertson, Leslie Sands, Hilda Braid, Melanie Hill, John Challis, Paul Chapman, Simon Williams, Christopher Ettridge, George Irving, Bill Wallis, Carolyn Pickles, Jonathan Newth, Kenneth Cope, Sally Whittaker, Karl Howman, Diana Coupland, Martin Jarvis, Rosalind Ayres, Yvette Fielding, Bert Parnaby, Robert Glenister, Mona Hammond, Steve Hodson, Danny O'Dea and Bernard Kay.

Episodes

Series 1 (1980)

Series 2 (1981)

Series 3 (1982)

Series 4 (1983)

Series 5 (1984)

Series 6 (1985)

See also
Down, Richard, and Christopher Perry (eds.). 1997. The British Television Drama Research Guide 1950–1997, second, revised edition. Ashton, Bristol: Kaleidoscope Publishing.
Tibballs, Geoff. 1992. The Boxtree Encyclopedia of TV Detectives. London: Boxtree Limited.

References

External links

1980 British television series debuts
1985 British television series endings
1980s British crime drama television series
1980s British police procedural television series
1980s British workplace drama television series
BBC crime television shows
BBC television dramas
English-language television shows
Television shows set in Lancashire